Guido Pedroni (21 August 1883 – 6 February 1964) was an Italian professional footballer, who played as a forward, and football referee.

Honours

Club 
Milan F.B.C.C.
Prima Categoria: 1906

Individual 
1906
Top scorer of the Prima Categoria: 3 goals

External links 
Profile at MagliaRossonera.it 

1883 births
1964 deaths
Italian footballers
Italian football referees
Association football forwards
A.C. Milan players